Sarduri, also Sarduris, Sardur was the name of several kings of Urartu:

Sarduri I (reign - 834 BC - 828 BC) 
Sarduri II (ruled 764-735 BC)
Sarduri III
Sarduri IV